The International Engineering School is an undergraduate school within the Engineering faculty at Tel Aviv University  (TAU). The TAU International Engineering School, or the International School of Engineering, currently offers a Bachelor of Science in Electrical & Electronics Engineering, an 8-semester program delivered entirely in English.

Faculty
TAU's Faculty of Engineering was established six years ago by merging three research departments. Over 30 of the 52 Engineering Faculty members are fellows of international professional associations such as the IEEE. Moshe Kam, the current president of the IEEE, is an alumnus of the Engineering Faculty.

Academic Ranking
According to the Academic Ranking of World Universities, TAU's Engineering faculty ranks in the top 100 in the world. According to the Academic Ranking, TAU performed #32 in Mathematics, between 51–75 in Physics and #28 in Computer Science.

References

External links
The Tel Aviv University International School of Engineering Website

Educational institutions established in 1956
Research institutes in Israel
Tel Aviv University
Colleges in Israel
Engineering universities and colleges in Israel
1956 establishments in Israel